Super single may refer to:
 Super single wheels on large trucks, where a single larger wheel and tire substitutes for a pair of tandem wheels
 Formula 450 motorcycle racing, originally called "Super Single" for its use of single cylinder engines